Justin O'Mara Brown (born April 16, 1982) is a former professional American, Canadian football and arena football defensive end. He was signed as an undrafted free agent by the Indianapolis Colts in 2005. He played college football for the East Central Tigers.

Brown has also played for the Frankfurt Galaxy, Dallas Desperados, New Orleans VooDoo, Calgary Stampeders and Edmonton Eskimos.

Early years

Brown was born in Fletcher, Oklahoma on April 16, 1982. He attended Elgin High School in Elgin, Oklahoma where he was all-district and an all-area selection.

College career
Brown attended East Central University where he majored in psychology. During his college career, he made a total of six All-American teams between 2001 and 2004.

2001
As a freshman, Brown had 14 tackles, one sack, one interception and two passes deflected in eight starts.

2002
Brown recorded 38 tackles, six sacks, and forced one fumble and started 10 games as a sophomore.

2003
During his junior year, Brown started 11 games. He recorded 53 tackles, six sacks, two deflected passes, and two forced fumbles. After the season, he was named a Lone Star Conference north second-team All-American.

2004
In his senior year he recorded career highs in tackles (72), sacks (10.5), tackles for losses (15), and deflected passes (10). He was named an American Football Coaches Association All-American, and the Lone Star Conference defensive lineman of the year.

Professional career

Indianapolis Colts
After going undrafted in the 2005 NFL Draft, Brown signed with the Indianapolis Colts in April.

Dallas Desperados
Brown signed with the Dallas Desperados for the 2006 Arena Football League season.

New Orleans VooDoo
In the second round of the 2006 Arena Football League expansion draft, Brown was selected by the New Orleans VooDoo.

Calgary Stampeders
On May 7, 2009, Brown signed with the Calgary Stampeders. In his regular season debut with Calgary, Brown has six tackles against the Montreal Alouettes. He was released on August 22.

Edmonton Eskimos
Brown was signed by the Edmonton Eskimos' practice roster on October 7, 2009.

References

1982 births
Living people
American football defensive linemen
American players of Canadian football
Calgary Stampeders players
Canadian football defensive linemen
Dallas Desperados players
East Central Tigers football players
Edmonton Elks players
Frankfurt Galaxy players
Indianapolis Colts players
New Orleans VooDoo players
People from Comanche County, Oklahoma
Players of American football from Oklahoma